Blighty is an English slang term for Britain.

Blighty may also refer to:
 Blighty, New South Wales, a town in Australia
 Blighty (TV channel), a former UKTV channel
 Blighty (magazine) or Parade, a British magazine for men
 Blighty (film), a 1927 silent film by Adrian Brunel